Partial general elections were held in the northern part of the Faroe Islands on 12 February 1910. The Union Party remained the largest in the Løgting, with 13 of the 20 seats.

Results

References

Elections in the Faroe Islands
Faroe Islands
1910 in the Faroe Islands
February 1910 events
Election and referendum articles with incomplete results